Mary "May" Morris (25 March 1862 – 17 October 1938) was an English artisan, embroidery designer, jeweller, socialist, and editor. She was the younger daughter of the Pre-Raphaelite artist and designer William Morris and his wife and artists' model, Jane Morris (née Burden).

Biography

May Morris was born on 25 March 1862 at Red House, Bexleyheath, and named Mary, as she was born on the Feast of the Annunciation.
May learned to embroider from her mother and her aunt Bessie Burden, who had been taught by William Morris. In 1878, she enrolled at the National Art Training School, precursor of the Royal College of Art. In 1885, aged 23, she became the Director of the Embroidery Department at her father's enterprise Morris & Co. During her time in the role she was responsible for producing a range of designs, which were frequently misattributed as her father's work. She ran this department until her father's death in 1896, where she moved into an advisory role. 

In 1886, May fell in love with Henry Halliday Sparling (1860–1924), secretary of the Socialist League. Despite her mother's concerns about her future son-in-law, they married on 14 June 1890 at Fulham Register Office. The Sparlings were divorced in 1898, and May resumed her maiden name.

In 1907, she founded the Women’s Guild of Arts with Mary Elizabeth Turner, as the Art Workers Guild did not admit women.

She edited her father's Collected Works in 24 volumes for Longmans, Green and Company, published from 1910 to 1915, and, after his death, commissioned two houses to be built in the style that he loved in the village of Kelmscott in the Cotswolds. Her companion at Kelmscott from 1917 until her death was Mary Lobb, a Land Army volunteer in the village.
May Morris died at Kelmscott Manor on 17 October 1938.

Embroidery

May Morris was an influential embroideress and designer, although her contributions are often overshadowed by those of her father, a towering figure in the Arts and Crafts movement. She continued his resurrection of free-form embroidery in the style which would be termed art needlework. Art needlework emphasized freehand stitching and delicate shading in silk thread thought to encourage self-expression in the needleworker in sharp contrast with the brightly coloured Berlin wool work needlepoint and its "paint by numbers" aesthetic which had gripped much of home embroidery in the mid-19th century.

May Morris was also active in the Royal School of Art Needlework (now Royal School of Needlework), founded as a charity in 1872 under the patronage of Princess Helena to maintain and develop the art of needlework through structured apprenticeships. The school originally opened in the autumn of 1872 in rooms in Sloane Street, London, with a staff of twenty women overseen by Lady Welby and Mrs Dolby, an "authority in ecclesiastical work". While the course available in the government schools of design for women was theoretical only, the RSAN had the distinct advantage of a practical, hands-on technical training. The school grew rapidly, and by 1875 had moved into their third locale, conveniently located in Exhibition Road next to the South Kensington Museum. The collections of ancient embroidery in the Museum were studied in an effort to understand and relearn old work.

Also among the staff at the RSAN were Jane Morris's sister, Elizabeth Burden, who was chief technical instructor from 1880, and designers Deborah Birnbaum (c1889) and Nellie Whichelo (c1890).

May Morris taught embroidery at the LCC Central School of Art in London from 1897, and was head of the Embroidery department from 1899 until 1905, thereafter continuing her association with the Central School as Visitor until 1910. She also taught at Birmingham, Leicester and Hammersmith Art School.

By 1916, there were many art schools under the LCC umbrella that included embroidery in their curriculum. Among the embroidery instructors were sisters Ellen M Wright and Fanny I Wright, both previously employed in the Embroidery Department at Morris & Co., and trained by May Morris. Ellen M Wright also taught at the Clapham School of Art, aided by Miss F Pooley, and Eleanor R Harriss and Mrs L Frampton taught at the Hammersmith School of Arts & Crafts.

Jewellery
Morris also designed and made jewellery. She began to design jewellery around the turn of the 20th century, and was probably inspired by the Birmingham jewellers Arthur and Georgie Gaskin, who were old family friends. Examples of her jewellery were donated by Mary Lobb to the Victoria and Albert Museum and Amgueddfa Cymru – National Museum Wales.

Publications

  Decorative Needlework. London: Joseph Hughes & Co., 1893.
 ed and Introd. Collected Works of William Morris. 24 v. London: Longmans, Green, 1910–1915. New York: Russell & Russell, 1966.
 "Coptic Textiles". Architectural Review 5 (1899), 274–287.
 "Chain Stitch Embroidery". Century Guild Hobby Horse 3 (1888), 25–29.
 "Line Embroidery". Art Workers' Quarterly 1:4 (October 1902), 117–121.
 "Opus Anglicanum – The Syon Cope". Burlington Magazine 6 (October 1904 – March 1905), 278–285.
 "Opus Anglicanum II – The Ascoli Cope". Burlington Magazine 6 (October 1904 – March 1905), 440–448.
 "Opus Anglicanum III – The Pienza Cope". Burlington Magazine 7 (April–September 1905), 54–65.
 "Opus Anglicanum at the Burlington Fine Arts Club". Burlington Magazine 7 (April–September 1905), 302–309.
 "William Morris". Letter. Times Literary Supplement. 905 (22 May 1919), 280.
 "William Morris". Letter. Times Literary Supplement. 1685 (17 May 1934).

Notes

References
Daly, Gay, Pre-Raphaelites in Love, Ticknor & Fields, 1989, .
Hulse, Lynn, editor May Morris: Art & Life. New Perspectives, Friends of the William Morris Gallery, 2017 .
Lochnan, Katharine, Douglas E. Schoenherr, and Carole Silver, editors: The Earthly Paradise: Arts and Crafts by William Morris and His Circle from Canadian Collections Key Porter Books, 1996, .
 Marsh, Jan, Jane and May Morris: A Biographical Story 1839–1938, London, Pandora Press, 1986 
 Marsh, Jan, Jane and May Morris: A Biographical Story 1839–1938 (updated edition, privately published by author), London, 2000
 Anna Mason, Jan Marsh, Jenny Lister, Rowan Bain and Hanne Faurby, authors May Morris: Arts & Crafts Designer. V&A/Thames and Hudson, 2017 .
 Naylor, Gillian: William Morris by Himself: Designs and Writings, London, Little Brown & Co. 2000 reprint of 1988 edition.
Todd, Pamela, Pre-Raphaelites at Home, New York, Watson-Guptill Publications, 2001, 
 Thomas, Zoe 'At Home with the Women's Guild of Arts: gender and professional identity in London studios, c. 1990-1925', article, Women's History Review 2015

External links

 
 
 
 Decorative Needlework by May Morris, 1893
 Works by May Morris at William Morris Gallery

External sources
 On Poetry, Painting and Politics: Letters of May Morris and John Quinn: The Letters of May Morris and John Quinn Hardcover – 28 Feb. 1997  by May Morris  (Author), John Quinn (Author), Janice Londraville (Editor)
 May Morris: Arts & Crafts Designer Hardcover – Illustrated, 28 Sept. 2017 by Anna Mason (Editor), Jan Marsh (Editor), Jenny Lister (Editor), Rowan Bain (Contributor), & Hanne Faurby (Contributor)
 May Morris, 1862-1938: Exhibition Catalogue Paperback – 10 Jan. 1989 by Helen Sloan (Author)

Arts and Crafts movement artists
English designers
Embroidery designers
English artists' models
1862 births

1938 deaths
Morris & Co.

English socialists
People educated at Notting Hill & Ealing High School
Members of the Fabian Society
English LGBT artists
Bisexual artists